Acrocercops tristaniae is a moth of the family Gracillariidae. It is known from Queensland, Australia.

The larvae feed on Eugenia ventenatii and Lophostemon confertus. They probably mine the leaves of their host plant.

References

tristaniae
Moths of Australia
Moths described in 1894